Nihad Haj Moustafa (born 30 November 1978) is a former Syrian footballer who played for Syria national football team.

External links
worldfootball.net
11v11.com

1978 births
Syrian footballers
Living people
Syria international footballers
Place of birth missing (living people)
Al-Jaish Damascus players
Hurriya SC players
Al-Wahda SC (Syria) players
Association football midfielders
Syrian Premier League players